György Wossala (born: 7 November 1941 Budapest) is a sailor from Hungary, who represented his country at the 1996 Summer Olympics in Savannah, United States as helmsman in the Soling. With crew members László Kovácsi and Károly Vezér they took the 20th place. 

Wossala held several positions within the sport of sailing. This includes the vice-presidency of ISAF, the Hungarian Yachting Association. He was president of the International Soling Association (1995 - 1998).

References

1941 births
Living people
Sailors at the 1996 Summer Olympics – Soling
Olympic sailors of Hungary
Sportspeople from Budapest
European Champions Soling
Hungarian male sailors (sport)